(born July 29, 1970) is a Japanese former volleyball player who competed in the 1996 Summer Olympics.

In 1996 she was eliminated with the Japanese team in the preliminary round of the Olympic tournament.

External links
 sports-reference.com

1970 births
Living people
Japanese women's volleyball players
Olympic volleyball players of Japan
Volleyball players at the 1996 Summer Olympics